The fourragère is a military award, distinguishing military units as a whole, in the form of a braided cord. The award was first adopted by France, followed by other nations such as the Netherlands, Belgium, Portugal, and Luxembourg. Fourragères have been awarded to units of both national and foreign militaries, except for that of Luxembourg, which has not been awarded to any foreign units.

The origin of the award is not entirely certain, but at least two conjectural stories have been posited.  The first involves Flemish soldiers serving under the Duke of Alva who were reported as having been cowardly in battle.  The Duke threatened them all with hanging if they did not perform better in future engagements, and the soldiers, so insulted by the insinuation, took to wearing cords tied to large nails around their shoulders, as if to say, "Hang me by this cord and nail if you see me run from battle."  Following this, the unit's members performed so well that the rope and nail became a badge of honor.

The other is that to the extent that an aiguillette is a form of fourragère, the wearing of armor by European knights required the use of ropes with metal tabs and a squire to cinch the armor into place—the squire would carry these cords over his shoulder, hence the association with aides de camp.

France

History 
As a regimental distinction the fourragère should not be confused with the aiguillette (distinctive insignia of the aide-de-camp) which was introduced by Napoleon I and which it closely resembles (the aiguillette is merely a golden fourragère).

The modern fourragère of the French Army is awarded to all members of military units which have been awarded a mention in despatches. It should not be confused with unit awards of particular decorations, where the medal itself is hung on the flag of the unit. For example, there are many units wearing the fourragère of the médaille militaire, whereas only six units wore the medal on their flags. 

It was introduced during the First World War, when the French Ministry of War first awarded the fourragère to units which had been recorded as distinguishing themselves more than once in the Orders of the Army. There were then six fourragères, depending on the numbers of Mentions in dispatches awarded to the unit:

If a unit received this distinction in both the First and Second World Wars, its fourragère bears two olives, one for each conflict it earned mentions. These olives are different:

During the Second World War, the medal of the Ordre de la Libération was awarded to the flags of 17 military units, whose members now wear a fourragère since June 18, 1996. This fourragère is considered the top unit award in the French military, as the ordre de la Libération award is seen to be more important than any mention in dispatches.

Certain French military units wear combinations of fourragères, if they were mentioned in orders in both one of the World War and an overseas (colonial) war. For example, the famous Foreign Legion regiment the 3rd Foreign Infantry wears a double fourragère red and green with red stripes (9 mentions during World War I), with an olive red with green stripes (3 mentions during World War II) and a fourragère yellow with green stripes, with an olive red and blue (5 mentions during Overseas Wars).

Fourragères used by the French Foreign Legion are:

2e REI (2nd Foreign Legion Infantry) – croix de guerre des TOE
2e REP (2nd Foreign Legion Paratroops) – Légion d'honneur
1er REC (1st Foreign Legion Cavalry) - Croix de Guerre (World War II); croix de guerre des TOE
3e REI (3rd Foreign Legion Infantry) – Légion d'honneur, Médaille militaire, Croix de Guerre
13e DBLE (13th Foreign Legion Demi-Brigade) – Ordre de la Libération

Personal wear of the fourragère 
The fourragère is normally worn by members of a unit awarded the decoration. When they leave the unit, they have to relinquish the fourragère. However members who took part personally in the actions leading to the award of the fourragère can continue to wear the fourragère, even after leaving the unit. They can only wear a fourragère corresponding to the number of actions they actually took part in. Thus, if a member of a 5-mentions regiment leaves but took part in only two mentioned actions, he can only wear the croix de guerre fourragère and not the médaille militaire fourragère.

Pictures

American Units awarded the fourragère 

 The 5th Marine Regiment and the 6th Marine Regiment of the United States Marine Corps were awarded the fourragère for having earned the Croix de Guerre with palm leaf three times during World War I.
 The 23rd Infantry Regiment, 2nd Division, A.E.F., was awarded the French Croix de Guerre with Palm three times, and awarded the French fourragère for service during World War I campaigns at Chateau Thierry, Aisne-Marne, and Meuse-Argonne. In addition, because several U.S. soldiers were present in front-line action during each battle for which the 23rd Infantry was awarded the Croix de Guerre, the French Government and U.S. Army Adjutant General allowed these soldiers to wear the fourragère as an individual decoration regardless of future unit assignment—a very rare honor. In total, 434 A.E.F. officers and men were certified to wear the French fourragère as an individual decoration, per the Final Report of the Secretary of War, 1922.
 17 French military units wear the fourragère of the Ordre de la Libération 
 370th Infantry Regiment (World War I)
82nd Airborne Division during the Battle of Normandy in June 1944.
The 12th Field Artillery Regiment was awarded the French Croix de Guerre in World War I and the Belgian fourragère in World War II.
The 104th Infantry Regiment was awarded the French Croix de Guerre in World War I and World War II.
The 121st Cavalry Squadron of the 106th Cavalry Group, XV Corps, was awarded the French Croix de Guerre and French fourragère for actions during World War II.
The 143rd Infantry Regiment, 36th Division, Texas Army National Guard, was awarded the French Croix de Guerre in connection with its action fought at Meuse-Argonne during World War I.
The 4th Infantry Division, consisting of the 8th, 12th (both cited twice) and the 22nd Infantry Regiments were awarded the Belgian fourragère for action in the Battle of the Bulge. The 8th Infantry was awarded the Presidential Unit Citation for the Beaches of Normandy, the 12th Infantry for Luxembourg (Battle of the Bulge) and the 22nd Infantry received three Presidential Unit Citations for Carentan (France), St. Gillis_Marigny (France), and the Hurtgen Forest (Battle of the Bulge).

World War I

World War II

Dutch Orange Lanyard

The Military William Order, or often named Military Order of William, is the oldest and highest honour of the Kingdom of the Netherlands. The Order's motto is Voor Moed, Beleid en Trouw (For Bravery, Leadership and Loyalty). The chivalric order was established on 30 April 1815 by King William I and was presented for feats of excellent bravery on the battlefield and as a meritorious decoration to senior military officers. Comparable with the French Légion d'Honneur but far less awarded, the Military William Order is a chivalry order of merit open to everyone regardless of rank and nobility, and not only to Dutch military but also foreigners. To date the Order is extremely rarely awarded and only for excellent bravery in battle.

The unit's Regimental Colour are decorated with the badge of the 4th Class itself, which hangs from the finial of the pike. The version of the Military William Order for unit members is known as the Orange Lanyard. Only those who served in a military unit at the particular time of action are entitled to wear the Orange Lanyard. The Orange Lanyard is worn as a cord around the right shoulder and can be worn simultaneously with the French or Belgian fourragère of the Croix de Guerre. The Orange Lanyard is considered a permanent decoration and is worn for the duration of a military member's career.

Belgian fourragère

The Belgian fourragère of 1940 was created by Prince Charles of Belgium, Regent of the Kingdom to honor certain military formations that distinguished themselves during the Second World War.  It consists of three cords terminated by a knot and a metal tag, and is braided in red and green; the colors of the Belgian Croix de guerre of 1940.  The fourragère is in cotton for non-commissioned officers and soldiers and in silk for officers.

Luxembourg fourragère
The Luxembourg Army currently awards an orange and blue fourragère.

Portuguese fourragères

Portugal has three fourragères: the War Cross (red and green), the Military Valor Medal (blue and white) and the Order of the Tower and Sword (solid blue).

South Vietnamese fourragère

The Vietnam Gallantry Cross is the equivalent of the French Croix de Guerre.  It was created by Decree No 74-b/Qt dated 15 August 1950 and Decree No 96/DQT/HC dated 2 May 1952.  Both individuals (denoted by a star) and formations (denoted by a palm) cited for gallantry were awarded the decoration.  Formations that were awarded the Gallantry Cross for two or more occasions were initially authorized to wear a fourragère.

The Vietnam Civil Action is another of the South Vietnamese fourragères. In appearance it resembled the Republic of Vietnam Cross of Gallantry, but rather than yellow and red, it was green and red.  Formations that were awarded the medal or emblem for two or more occasions are authorized to wear a fourragère. Many units and individuals were awarded one award, but few were presented with a second award.

Decorative fourragères
Fourragères are often worn as decorative items to liven up ceremonial uniforms in military, police, and cadet organisations.  Members of the United States and Canadian 1st Special Service Force wore a red, white, and blue fourragère made out of parachute shroud lines without having earned them in any particular form of military engagement.

See also 
 Aiguillette

References 

Formal insignia
Military awards and decorations of France
Braids